The 2021 UEFA European Under-21 Championship (also known as UEFA Under-21 Euro 2021) was the 23rd edition of the UEFA European Under-21 Championship (26th edition if the Under-23 era is also included), the biennial international youth football championship organised by UEFA for the men's under-21 national teams of Europe. Initially, 12 teams were to play in the tournament, however on 6 February 2019, UEFA's executive committee increased this number to 16. Only players born on or after 1 January 1998 were eligible to participate.

The tournament was co-hosted by Hungary and Slovenia. It was originally scheduled to take place from 9 to 26 June 2021. However, the tournament was rescheduled following the postponement of UEFA Euro 2020 to June/July 2021 due to the COVID-19 pandemic. The new dates were to be decided initially on 27 May 2020, but then postponed to 17 June 2020, where the UEFA Executive Committee meeting discussed the calendar and format of the tournament. On 17 June 2020, UEFA announced the tournament would be played in two stages; the group stage, which took place from 24 to 31 March 2021, and the knockout stage, which took place from 31 May to 6 June 2021. Due to COVID-19 Pandemic the VAR system wasn't used.

Spain were the defending champions, but were eliminated in the knockout phase by Portugal.

Host selection
The following associations indicated their interests to bid for the tournament:
 /  (joint bid)

Hungary and Slovenia were appointed as co-hosts at the UEFA Executive Committee meeting in Dublin, Republic of Ireland on 3 December 2018.

Qualification

All 55 UEFA nations entered the competition, and, unlike the last competition, co-hosts Hungary and Slovenia qualified automatically, and the other 53 teams competed in the qualifying competition to determine the remaining 14 spots in the final tournament. The draw for the qualifying group stage was held on 11 December 2018. The qualifying group stage took place from March 2019 to October 2020, while the play-offs were set to take place in November 2020. The qualifying competition would originally consist of two rounds:
Qualifying group stage: The 53 teams were drawn into nine groups: eight groups of six teams and one group of five teams. Each group was played in home-and-away round-robin format. The nine group winners and the best runner-up (not counting results against the sixth-placed team) qualified directly for the final tournament, while the remaining eight runners-up advance to the play-offs.
Play-offs: The eight teams were drawn into four ties to play home-and-away two-legged matches to determine the last four qualified teams.

However, due to the COVID-19 pandemic in Europe which caused the postponement of matches in the qualifying group stage, UEFA announced on 17 June 2020 that the play-offs would be cancelled. Instead, the nine group winners and the five best runners-up (not counting results against the sixth-placed team) qualified for the final tournament.

Qualified teams
The following teams qualified for the final tournament.

Note: All appearance statistics include only U-21 era (since 1978).

Notes

Final draw
The final draw was held on 10 December 2020, 15:00 CET, at the UEFA headquarters in Nyon, Switzerland. The sixteen teams were drawn into four groups of four teams. The teams were seeded according to their coefficient ranking following the end of the qualifying stage, calculated based on the following:
2017 UEFA European Under-21 Championship final tournament and qualifying competition (20%)
2019 UEFA European Under-21 Championship final tournament and qualifying competition (40%)
2021 UEFA European Under-21 Championship qualifying competition (group stage only) (40%)

The hosts Hungary and Slovenia were assigned to position A1 and B1 respectively in the draw, while the other fourteen teams were drawn to the other available positions in their group.

Venues
The following were the venues where the competition was played:

The provisional schedule was announced in November 2019, with the above eight venues hosting matches. Hungary (Groups A and C) and Slovenia (Groups B and D) would both host two groups, two quarter-finals and one semi-final each, while the final would be played in Slovenia at the Stožice Stadium, Ljubljana.

Match officials

Fourth officials
 Jérôme Brisard
 Irakli Kvirikashvili
 Ádám Farkas
 Daniele Doveri
 Espen Eskås
 Horațiu Feșnic
 Rade Obrenović
 Juan Martínez Munuera

Squads

Each national team had to submit a squad of 23 players, three of whom had to be goalkeepers. If a player was injured or ill severely enough to prevent his participation in the tournament before his team's first match, he could be replaced by another player.

Group stage
The group winners and runners-up advanced to the quarter-finals.

Tiebreakers
In the group stage, teams were ranked according to points (3 points for a win, 1 point for a draw, 0 points for a loss), and if tied on points, the following tiebreaking criteria were applied, in the order given, to determine the rankings (Regulations Articles 18.01 and 18.02):
Points in head-to-head matches among tied teams;
Goal difference in head-to-head matches among tied teams;
Goals scored in head-to-head matches among tied teams;
If more than two teams were tied, and after applying all head-to-head criteria above, a subset of teams were still tied, all head-to-head criteria above were reapplied exclusively to this subset of teams;
Goal difference in all group matches;
Goals scored in all group matches;
Penalty shoot-out if only two teams had the same number of points, and they met in the last round of the group and were tied after applying all criteria above (not used if more than two teams had the same number of points, or if their rankings were not relevant for qualification for the next stage);
Disciplinary points (red card = 3 points, yellow card = 1 point, expulsion for two yellow cards in one match = 3 points);
UEFA coefficient ranking for the final draw.

All times are local, CET (UTC+1) for matches between 24 and 27 March 2021, CEST (UTC+2) for matches between 28 and 31 March 2021.

Group A

Group B

Group C

Group D

Knockout stage
In the knockout stage, extra time and a penalty shoot-out were used to decide the winners if necessary.

Bracket

Quarter-finals

Semi-finals

Final

Goalscorers

Awards
The following awards were given at the conclusion of the tournament:
Player of the Tournament:  Fábio Vieira
Golden Boot:  Lukas Nmecha

Team of the tournament
After the tournament the Under-21 Team of the Tournament was selected by the UEFA Technical Observers.

Broadcasting

Europe

Outside Europe

Notes

References

External links

Under-21 Matches: 2021, UEFA.com

 
2021
Under-21 Championship
2021 in youth association football
International association football competitions hosted by Hungary
International association football competitions hosted by Slovenia
March 2021 sports events in Europe
June 2021 sports events in Hungary
June 2021 sports events in Slovenia